Thomas Grice (born 29 September 1992) is an Australian sports shooter. He competed in the men's trap event and the team event with Penny Smith at the 2020 Summer Olympics. He did not score sufficient points in either event to advance past qualification.

References

External links
 

1992 births
Living people
Australian male sport shooters
Olympic shooters of Australia
Shooters at the 2020 Summer Olympics
Sportspeople from Sydney
Sportsmen from New South Wales
21st-century Australian people